Ushpia was according to the Assyrian King List (AKL) the 16th Assyrian monarch, ruling in Assyria's early period, though he is not attested in any known contemporary artefacts. The list places him as the second last within the section "kings who lived in tents”. According to the Cambridge Ancient History, the conclusion of this section, "marked the end of the nomadic period of the Assyrian people." Ushpia is alleged to have founded the temple for the god Aššur within the city-state of Aššur, according to the much later inscriptions of both of these Assyrian kings: Shulmanu-asharedu I (fl. c. 1273 BC) and Aššur-ahu-iddin (fl. 681 BC). Ushpia is succeeded on the AKL by Apiashal. Arthur Ungnad interpreted both Ushpia's and Kikkia's names as being that of the Hurrian language (as opposed to the Assyrian dialect of the Semitic Akkadian language), but; Arno Poebel was not convinced by this interpretation and more recent research no longer holds Ungnad's thesis as tenable.

See also

 Timeline of the Assyrian Empire
 Early Period of Assyria
 List of Assyrian kings
 Assyrian continuity
 Assyrian people
 Assyria

References

21st-century BC Assyrian kings